Sir Thomas Gage, 7th Baronet, of Hengrave (1781 – 27 December 1820, in Rome) was an English botanist from Rokewode-Gage baronets. The woodland flower Gagea is named in his honour.

He married Mary-Anne Browne, the daughter of Valentine Browne, 1st Earl of Kenmare.

In his herbarium he had various plant specimens including Iris subbiflora.

References

English botanists
1781 births
1820 deaths
Thomas
Baronets in the Baronetage of England
19th-century British botanists
19th-century English people